Association Sportive d'Origine Arménienne de Valence was a French football team playing in the city of Valence, Drôme.

History
The team ended in 2005 due to financial problems. Its successor is AS Valence, which plays at an amateur level.

Notable players

Managerial history
1984 – 11/1993:  Pierre Ferrazzi
11/1993 – 1995:  Didier Notheaux
1995 – 1998:  Léonce Lavagne
1998 – 11/1999:  Bruno Metsu
11/1999 – 09/2000:  Denis Zanko
09/2000 – 2003:  Didier Notheaux
2003 – 2005:  Alain Ravera
2005 – August 2005:  Jean-Christophe Cano

References

External links
 History

 
Association football clubs established in 1920
Association football clubs disestablished in 2005
1920 establishments in France
2005 disestablishments in France
Sport in Drôme
Defunct football clubs in France
Valence, Drôme
Armenian association football clubs outside Armenia